Mount Wistar ( or Wistar Bjerg) is a mountain in Peary Land, Northern Greenland. Administratively it is part of the Northeast Greenland National Park.

History 
Mt Wistar was deemed to have been seen in 1900 by Robert Peary from the northern side of the Frederick E. Hyde Fjord. It was named after General Isaac J. Wistar (1827-1905), then President of the Academy of Natural Sciences in Philadelphia. Peary thought he recognized it as a mountain he had seen from Navy Cliff in his 1892 expedition. It was mapped by Danish Arctic explorer Lauge Koch and named (Wistars Fjeld) during his Cartographic Air Expedition of 1938. In 1950 Eigil Knuth, the leader of the Danish Peary Land Expedition, asserted that the mountain was part of Nordkrone.

Geography
Mt Wistar is the highest peak of the Nordkrone and is located to the south of the middle stretch of Frederick E. Hyde Fjord in Peary Land, east of the eastern shore of Thor Fjord and west of Freja Fjord. The mountain rises northwest of the Balder Glacier.

Polar climate prevails in the area of Mt Wistar, the average annual temperature in the area being .

See also
List of mountains in Greenland
Peary Land

Bibliography
Greenland geology and selected mineral occurrences - GEUS

References

Wistar
Peary Land